The Pacific Coast Air Museum, in Santa Rosa, California, is a non-profit organization dedicated to promoting and preserving aviation history through the acquisition, restoration, and display of historic aircraft. The museum displays a varied collection of over 30 American military, propeller, and jet aircraft.

Facility and exhibits 

The museum is located about eight miles northwest of downtown Santa Rosa, at the Charles M. Schulz - Sonoma County Airport. Exhibits documenting local aviation history are housed in an original WW II era fabrication shop, along with an aviation reference library, and gift shop featuring aviation themed books, clothing, and toys.

 
The museum displays a varied collection of about two dozen military aircraft from World War II, the Korean War, and the Vietnam War, including an A-4 Skyhawk, a Lockheed D-21 drone, an F-16 Fighting Falcon, an F-105 Thunderchief, an F-106A Delta Dart, and a UH-1 Iroquois ("Huey") helicopter. It also has a kit-built Bede BD-5, the world's lightest jet aircraft; and a hand-built replica of civilian aviation's most famous historic aerobatic airplane, a Pitts Special S1.

In December 2010, the museum acquired the historic USAF "First Responder" F-15 Eagle aircraft. Dispatched from the Otis Air National Guard Base in Massachusetts, it was the first of a dozen fighter planes over New York City and Washington, D.C. on 9/11. The museum plans to fully restore the plane, with a Revolutionary "Minuteman" emblem stenciled on its tail, and make it the centerpiece of an interactive, educational exhibit.

The museum employs corporate sponsorships for a majority of the funds it raises, and hundreds of various corporate logos can be seen next to displays and exhibits, throughout the museum.

Next to the museum, immediately to the north, is the airplane hangar used in the 1963 Hollywood all-star comedy movie, It's a Mad, Mad, Mad, Mad World. In the movie, stunt pilot Frank Tallman flies a Beech D-18 full bore, at about 150 knots, through the airplane hangar in less than a second, with only 23 feet of clearance from wingtip to wingtip, and only 15 feet from the top of the tail to the hangar ceiling. Known as the Butler Building, the hangar was built during World War II, and is still in use today.

The museum intends to build and move to a new larger facility, still at the airport. One possibility is a location on Airport Boulevard at the main entrance to the county airport, a five-acre garden tilled by inmates at Sonoma County's low-security jail.

Activities 
The museum promotes aircraft operational safety, offers classes on aviation history and principles of flight, conducts an aviation summer school and merit badge in aviation program for Boy Scouts, and has an aviation Master Story teller for story time. The museum is very actively involved in community cultural events, supports many civic organizations, and also provides speakers for civic groups.

An annual 2-day weekend air show in August, "Wings over Wine Country", draws over 20,000 visitors for events featuring military jet demo teams, skydiving, hang-gliding, biplane aerobatics, and tours of all the museum's airplanes, including an A-26 Invader attack bomber, the only aircraft to see combat in WW II, Korea, and Vietnam.

History 

Founded in 1989, the museum merged in 1999 with the Redwood Empire Aviation Historical Society, a smaller organization. In late 2001, the museum, which had rented a variety of hangars and tie-down spots for its collection of aircraft, at the Sonoma County airport, began the process of moving to a larger facility.

References

External links 

 Museum website
 Wings over Wine Country Air Show

Aerospace museums in California
Military and war museums in California
Museums in Santa Rosa, California